Crystal (born May 6, 1994) is a female capuchin monkey and animal actress, acquired and trained by Birds & Animals Unlimited, Hollywood's largest supplier of animals. Her acting career began as a baby monkey in Disney's 1997 film George of the Jungle. More recently, she portrayed the annoying monkey Dexter in the Night at the Museum franchise, a drug-dealing monkey in The Hangover Part II, and as pet monkey Bennie in Steven Spielberg's 2022 semi-autobiographical film The Fabelmans.  In 2012, she played Dr. Rizzo on the sitcom Animal Practice.

Acting career

Universal Studios 
In 1996, Birds & Animals Unlimited, the largest furnisher of animals to Hollywood, sent one of its trainers to purchase a capuchin monkey in Florida. Birds & Animals prefers to begin training younger monkeys, optimally those close to one year old. Audacious two-and-half-year-old Crystal, whose canine teeth had begun showing, was offered. The trainer ultimately decided to buy Crystal and two younger capuchin monkeys as well. Three employees received the three monkeys. Crystal was given to Tom Gunderson, an employee who had only been with the company for a few years and had been primarily working at Universal Studios Florida's Animal Actors stage show. Gunderson had let the other two employees select their monkeys first and was left with the oldest, Crystal. He named her Crystal, a namesake to a country music singer Crystal Gayle.  New York magazine's Benjamin Wallace wrote, "It was like she was born to perform."

Gunderson and Crystal worked together for eight years at the Animal Actors stage show. Because the show was marked by pyrotechnics and noisy, cheering audiences, Gunderson said it was "a boot camp" and "a great way for a monkey to grow up and become habituated for this kind of environment". Unlike the majority of monkeys who were bothered by high volume music and children, Crystal was remarkably mature. Rather than destroy a stuffed animal as any other monkey would do, she preferred to groom herself and work the levers of a child's activity center.

Television and film
Having appeared in over 20 films by 2011, Crystal first starred in the 1997 film George of the Jungle. Wallace of the magazine New York said her Internet Movie Database page is "more hit-studded than most actors three times her age", and Joe Flint of the Los Angeles Times called her "a veteran of movies and TV with an enviable IMDB credit list". USA Today called Crystal "Hollywood's Hottest Monkey" and the Los Angeles Times called her the most powerful pet in Hollywood".

She is known for her roles in the 2006 film Night at the Museum and its sequels, Night at the Museum: Battle of the Smithsonian (2009) and Night at the Museum: Secret of the Tomb (2014), playing troublesome monkey Dexter (also playing another character, Able, in the second film). In the 2009 film, her character slapped Ben Stiller, while her trainer encouraged her with "Get him! Get him! Hit him harder! Hit him harder!" Stiller joked that "I really dislike the monkey. There's no way to feel great about having a monkey slap your face on any level." During filming, Crystal in an "unscripted moment" relieved herself on Robin Williams, who was playing Teddy Roosevelt. Williams said, "It combines the worst aspects of working with children and animals when you have an animal that looks like a child ... Plus, what human can [defecate] on you in the middle of a scene and people would be like 'Awww, great'".

She has done cameos with David Hasselhoff in the 2011 film Hop and with Ken Jeong in the NBC comedy series Community. She made a special appearance on Communitys panel at the San Diego Comic-Con in July 2011.

She portrayed a drug dealing monkey in the 2011 film The Hangover Part II. Director Todd Phillips raised concerns after he joked that Crystal had become addicted to cigarettes after learning to smoke them for the film. Philips later explained that Crystal never actually held a lit cigarette on the film's set, the smoke was added digitally in post-production, and the cigarette was ceramic. Still, PETA protested Crystal's appearance in the film because the studio used exotic animals for entertainment purposes and because the film does not carry the American Humane Association's disclaimer that "no animals were harmed" since the group was denied set visits. Ken Jeong, Crystal's fellow actor in The Hangover Part II, Community, and Zookeeper, praised her, saying, "She's amazing. She's not a monkey, she's an actor. And quite possibly the best actor I've worked with."

In 2011 she played Donald the Monkey in the Frank Coraci-directed film Zookeeper and was voiced by Adam Sandler. Crystal also played Crystal the Capuchin in the Cameron Crowe-directed film We Bought a Zoo.

After gymnast Gabby Douglas's gold medal-winning performance at 2012 Summer Olympics individual all-around, NBC aired a commercial of Crystal swinging on gymnastic rings. Wallace of the magazine New York called it a "cringe-worthy juxtaposition" that sparked much debate about racism on Twitter. Sportscaster Bob Costas had just said, "There are some African American girls out there who tonight are saying to themselves: 'Hey, I'd like to try that too.'" Crystal's ad had been broadcast three times previously and was a promotion for NBC's upcoming sitcom, Animal Practice.

She played Dr. Rizzo, a crony of misanthropic veterinarian Dr. George Coleman in Animal Practice, a sitcom that debuted on September 26, 2012. Before the show was cancelled due to low ratings, Crystal netted her owner $12,000 per episode; the earnings from nine episodes meant that for the year she made more than twice as much as the average Hollywood actor. New Yorks Wallace observed the filming of a scene in which Crystal gives Coleman a shoulder massage. Gunderson used gestures to coax Crystal to perform the desired action and let her lick yogurt from his fingers upon finishing. After each scene, Gunderson rewards her with a treat. Wallace noted that her favorite treats included "chocolate, Nutella, grapes, pistachios, peanuts, the odd crafts-services banana, a weekly egg for protein, and, off-set, spiders and flies".

In 2019, Crystal appeared as a security guard in the Hindi language Bollywood film Total Dhamaal. In 2022, she appeared in Steven Spielberg's semi-autobiographical film The Fabelmans as Bennie, the pet monkey of the titular family.

Personal life
Crystal lives with her trainer, Tom Gunderson, in Los Angeles County, California. Other animals live in the home, "including dogs, horses, a cat, and another female capuchin, named Squirt." Crystal, who sleeps no less than eight hours every day, shares a mattress with Gunderson, his wife, fellow capuchin Squirt, and a chihuahua.

Filmography

See also
 List of individual monkeys

References

External links 

 

1994 animal births
Animal actors
Individual monkeys